The Hymenochaetaceae are a family of fungi in the order Hymenochaetales. The family contains several species that are implicated in many diseases of broad-leaved and coniferous trees, causing heart rot, canker and root diseases, and also esca disease of grapevines. According to a standard reference text, the family contains 27 genera and 487 species.

Genera

References

 
Hymenochaetaceae